Admiral Sir Henry Fairfax  (21 January 1837 – 20 March 1900) was a Royal Navy officer who went on to serve as Commander-in-Chief, Plymouth.

Naval career
Fairfax was born in 1837, the third son of Sir Henry Fairfax, 1st Baronet. He joined the Royal Navy in December 1850, and during early years was posted to the HMS Amphitrite, which took him on two trips to the Behring Strait and the Arctic Sea. Promoted to lieutenant on 25 August 1858, he served on board the sloop HMS Ariel and on 4 November 1862 was promoted to commander for "distinguished valour in the capture of a pirate slaver". He was promoted to captain on 3 April 1868, and served as naval attaché on a special mission to the Sultan of Zanzibar in 1872–73. On his return he served for nearly 12 months as private secretary to George Goschen, First Lord of the Admiralty. He was captain of Britannia, the Royal Navy Officer training establishment between 1877 and 1882, during which years the Princes Albert Victor and George stayed there for preparatory naval training. He was appointed Naval Aide-de-camp to Queen Victoria in 1882, a Companion of the Order of the Bath (CB), and a Fellow of the Royal Geographic Society (FRGS).

He was promoted to flag rank as rear admiral on 1 July 1885. In February 1887 he received appointment as commander-in-chief of Australia Station, the description given to the naval command of British colonial possessions in Australia and South Pacific and, on his return to the United Kingdom he became Second Naval Lord on 24 October 1889. He was promoted to vice-admiral on 20 July 1891, and served from 1892 to 1895 as commander of the Channel Fleet, which was historically charged with defending the waters of the English Channel. In November 1892,  stranded on rocks at the entrance to Ferrol Harbour; Fairfax as officer commanding the squadron was court-martialled but was acquitted on the ground that the chart in use was unreliable. He was promoted to Knight Commander of the Order of the Bath (KCB) in the May 1896 Birthday Honours.

Promoted to admiral on 10 May 1897, he was in 1899 appointed Commander-in-Chief, Plymouth, serving as such until he died.

He was a deputy lieutenant and a justice of the peace for Roxburghshire, in which county he owned property.

Fairfax died in Naples in March 1900, while staying there for health reasons on leave of absence from his command. His widow received personal telegraphs of condolences from Queen Victoria and the Duke of York (future King George V) after his death.

Family
In 1872 he married Harriet Kinloch, daughter of Sir David Kinloch.

References

External links
 

|-

|-

|-

1837 births
1900 deaths
Lords of the Admiralty
Royal Navy admirals
Military personnel from Edinburgh
Royal Navy personnel of the Anglo-Egyptian War
Royal Navy officers who were court-martialled
Fellows of the Royal Geographical Society
Knights Commander of the Order of the Bath
Younger sons of baronets